Paweł Bocian (born 9 April 1973) is a Polish former footballer who played as a defender.

Career

In 1997, Bocian signed for Fortuna Düsseldorf in the German second division.

Before the 2003 season, he signed for Persib Bandung, Indonesia's most successful club, but was considered redundant due to 3 foreign players allowed to be on the pitch and left after refusing to play as a sweeper.

In 2003, he signed for Kujawiak Włocławek in the Polish lower leagues.

References

External links
 

Polish footballers
2. Bundesliga players
Association football defenders
Living people
1973 births
Footballers from Poznań
Expatriate footballers in Indonesia
Polish expatriate sportspeople in Germany
Persib Bandung players
Ekstraklasa players
Olimpia Poznań players
Lech Poznań players
Fortuna Düsseldorf players
Widzew Łódź players
Kujawiak Włocławek players
Mieszko Gniezno players
Expatriate footballers in Germany
Wisła Płock players